Coptaspis is a genus of bush crickets in the tribe Agraeciini, containing the following species:

Coptaspis brevipennis Redtenbacher, 1891
Coptaspis crassinervosa Redtenbacher, 1891
Coptaspis elegans Willemse, 1966
Coptaspis lateralis Erichson, 1842

References

External links 

 

Conocephalinae
Tettigoniidae genera